Xhafer is an Albanian masculine given name that may refer to
Xhafer bej Ypi (1880–1940), Albanian politician 
Xhafer Deva (1904–1978), Kosovo Albanian politician 
Xhafer Deva's house in Kosovo
Xhafer Spahiu (born 1923), Albanian politician

Albanian masculine given names